The Hirth 3502 and 3503 are a family of liquid-cooled, in-line twin-cylinder, two-stroke, carbureted aircraft engines, with optional fuel injection, designed for use on ultralight aircraft and small homebuilts. It is manufactured by Hirth of Germany.

Development
The engines were developed as competitors to the  Rotax 582 with an identical mounting bolt pattern to the 582, allowing either to be a drop-in replacement. The engines are similar to the Rotax powerplant in being liquid-cooled, two-cylinder in-line engines, with dual capacitor discharge ignition. The 3502 was developed from the 3503 as a de-rated version and produces , in comparison to the 3503's . Both engines have the same bore, stroke and compression ratio as the three-cylinder in-line liquid-cooled Hirth 3701 and the bore, stroke, compression ratio and displacement of the twin-cylinder Hirth 2704 and Hirth 2706.

Both the 3502 and 3503 are equipped with dual Bing 34 mm slide carburetors or optionally electronic fuel injection. The cylinder walls are electrochemically coated with Nikasil and the crankshaft is forged from 4130 steel. Standard starting is recoil start with electric start as an option. The reduction drive system available is the G-50 gearbox, with reduction ratios of 2.16:1, 2.29:1, 2.59:1, 3.16:1, or 3.65:1.

The engines run on a 50:1 pre-mix of unleaded 93 octane auto fuel and oil, or optionally oil injection.

Variants
3502
Twin-cylinder in-line, liquid-cooled, two-stroke aircraft engine with dual Bing 34 mm slide carburetors or fuel injection. Produces  at 5000 rpm and has a factory rated TBO of 1200 hours. In production since April 2008.
3503
Twin-cylinder in-line, liquid-cooled, two-stroke aircraft engine with dual Bing 34 mm slide carburetors or fuel injection. Produces  at 6500 rpm and has a factory rated TBO of 1000 hours. In production.

Applications
3502
CGS Hawk Arrow II
Fresh Breeze XCitor - powered parachute
Paraski - powered parachute
3503
Excalibur Aircraft Excalibur
GyroTec DF02
Rotortec Cloud Dancer Light
Summit Steel Breeze - powered parachute
Vortech Skylark - helicopter

Specifications (3503)

References

External links
Official 3502 page
Official 3503 page

Hirth aircraft engines
Two-stroke aircraft piston engines